Corydoras incolicana is a tropical freshwater fish belonging to the Corydoradinae sub-family of the family Callichthyidae. It originates in inland waters in South America. Corydoras incolicana is restricted to the Upper Negro River basin.

References

Eschmeyer, W.N. (ed.), 1998. Catalog of fishes. Special Publication, California Academy of Sciences, San Francisco. 3 vols. 2905 p.  

Corydoras
Catfish of South America
Taxa named by Warren E. Burgess
Fish described in 1993